The Men's Discus Throw event at the 2010 South American Games was held on March 21 at 18:00.

Medalists

Records

Results
Results were published.

Final

See also
2010 South American Under-23 Championships in Athletics

References

External links
Final

Discus M